is a professional Japanese baseball player. He plays infielder for the Orix Buffaloes.

References 

1990 births
Living people
Baseball people from Tokyo
Nippon Professional Baseball infielders
Orix Buffaloes players
Asian Games bronze medalists for Japan
Asian Games medalists in baseball
Baseball players at the 2014 Asian Games
Medalists at the 2014 Asian Games
People from Edogawa, Tokyo